Intermission I & II is a double extended play (EP) by American singer Trey Songz, released on May 18, 2015 in the United States.

Background
While Songz was serving as a supporting guest on the European leg of The Pinkprint Tour with Nicki Minaj, in support of his last album Trigga (2014), along with Chris Brown and Tyga was doing sold-out shows on the Between The Sheets Tour. He released the EP as a surprise to keep his fans from waiting for new material until Trigga: Reloaded and Tremaine are released later in 2015. The second part was released in May, which added six more tracks to the EP, the whole thing was dropped on iTunes.

Track listing 

Notes
 Originally, on Intermission 1, track 4 was the song "Good Girls vs. Bad Girls", which contained a sample of "Come Thru" by Jacquees.

Charts

References

2015 EPs
Trey Songz albums
Atlantic Records EPs
Albums produced by Da Internz